The Higher Authority for Realisation of the Objectives of the Revolution, Political Reform and Democratic Transition 
() was a transitional authority in the aftermath of the Tunisian Revolution.

It was created on 15 March 2011 by merging of the Conseil de défense de la révolution and the short-lived Higher Political Reform Commission. Yadh Ben Achour was named president of the authority. Having finished its mission, the authority was dissolved on 13 October 2011.

Tunisian Revolution
2011 establishments in Tunisia
2011 disestablishments in Tunisia
Reform in Tunisia